is a 1958 color Japanese film directed by Umetsugu Inoue.

Cast 
 Yujiro Ishihara : Sugiura Kenkichi
 Yumeji Tsukioka : Hanaoka Mari
 Ruriko Asaoka : Ogin
 Mari Shiraki : Kono Akemi
 Ko Nishimura : Kano
 Toru Abe : Akanuma
 Masumi Okada : Santa

References 

1958 films
Films directed by Umetsugu Inoue
Nikkatsu films
1950s Japanese films